Father & Soldier is a 2022 French-Senegalese war-drama film directed by Mathieu Vadepied, starring Omar Sy, Alassane Diong, and Jonas Bloquet. It was produced by Omar Sy and Bruno Nahon. The film opened the Un Certain Regard section in competition at the 75th Cannes Film Festival, on 18 May 2022. The film was released in theaters in France by Gaumont on 4 January 2023.

Plot
During World War I, in 1917, Bakary Diallo enlists in the French Army in order to be with his 17-year-old son, Thierno, who was recruited against his will. Sent to the front, they find themselves facing the war together in the French colony of Senegal.

Cast
 Omar Sy as Bakary Diallo
 Alassane Diong as Thierno
 Jonas Bloquet as Lieutenant Chambreau
 Bamar Kane as Salif
 Oumar Sey as Abdoulaye

Production
With a $14 million budget, the film was produced by Bruno Nahon's Unité and Omar Sy's Korokoro in co-production with Gaumont, France 3 Cinéma, Mille Soleils and Sy Possible Africa. It was co-produced by Mathieu Vadepied, with Maryvonne Le Meur and Caroline Nataf serving as associate producers. The screenplay was written by Vadepied and Olivier Demangel.

Alexandre Desplat composed the original music for the film.

Filming
The film was shot in France from 23 August 2021 to 13 October 2021, before moving on to Senegal in January 2022. It was partially shot in Neufmaison, Ardennes.

Marketing
A 1-minute clip from the film was released on Le HuffPost's YouTube channel on 19 May 2022.

On 10 November 2022, the film's official poster and official trailer were released.

Release
The film had its world premiere at the 75th Cannes Film Festival as the opening film in the Un Certain Regard section on 18 May 2022. It will be distributed in France and internationally by Gaumont. It was released in French cinemas on 4 January 2023.

Reception
Rotten Tomatoes gives the film a score of 83% based on 6 reviews.

AlloCiné, a French cinema website, gave the film an average rating of 3.3/5, based on a survey of 27 French reviews.

Box Office
The film sold over 55,000 tickets on its first day of release in France, with 2,034 viewers per screening in 554 theaters. During its first weekend of release, Father & Soldier sold over 456,000 tickets, ranking number two at the box office, behind Avatar: The Way of Water (1,6 million entries), and in front of Puss in Boots: The Last Wish (168,061 entries)

Accolades

References

External links
 
 
 Father & Soldier at Cannes Film Festival

2022 films
2022 drama films
2022 war drama films
French World War I films
Films set in 1917
French war drama films
Senegalese drama films
Films set in France
Films shot in France
Films set in Senegal
Films shot in Senegal
Gaumont Film Company films
Films scored by Alexandre Desplat
2020s French films